Mark Lambert is an Irish actor.

Filmography

Television work

External links
 Profile, lisarichards.ie; accessed 31 August 2014.
 

Living people
Irish male film actors
Irish male stage actors
Irish male television actors
Place of birth missing (living people)
Year of birth missing (living people)